Lanercost is a village in the northern part of Cumbria, England.  The settlement is in the civil parish of Burtholme, in the City of Carlisle local government district.  Lanercost is known for the presence of Lanercost Priory and its proximity to Hadrian's Wall.

History
Lanercost Priory was founded in 1165 as an Augustinian house of Canons.

See also

Listed buildings in Burtholme

References

External links
 Cumbria County History Trust: Burtholme (nb: provisional research only – see Talk page)

Villages in Cumbria
City of Carlisle